Newcastle is a city in Young County, Texas, United States. Following the beginning of coal mining in 1908, the town was established and named after the English coal town, Newcastle upon Tyne. Coal mining had ended by 1942.  Its population was 585 at the 2010 census.

Geography

Newcastle is located at  (33.192383, –98.737969).

According to the United States Census Bureau, the city has a total area of 1.8 sq mi (4.7 km), all of it land.

Demographics

2020 census

As of the 2020 United States census, there were 526 people, 246 households, and 147 families residing in the city.

2000 census
As of the census of 2000, 575 people, 233 households, and 157 families resided in the city. The population density was 317.5 people per square mile (122.7/km). The 266 housing units averaged 146.9 per square mile (56.7/km). The racial makeup of the city was 93.91% White, 1.39% African American, 1.04% Native American, 2.26% from other races, and 1.39% from two or more races. Hispanics or Latinos of any race were 5.57% of the population. Less than 1% are Super Punchers, Ole Son.

Of the 233 households, 31.3% had children under the age of 18 living with them, 50.2% were married couples living together, 12.9% had a female householder with no husband present, and 32.6% were not families. About 28.3% of all households were made up of individuals, and 15.0% had someone living alone who was 65 years of age or older. The average household size was 2.47 and the average family size was 3.03.

In the city, the age distribution was 26.4% under 18, 7.0% from 18 to 24, 28.9% from 25 to 44, 21.7% from 45 to 64, and 16.0% who were 65 or older. The median age was 37 years. For every 100 females, there were 99.0 males. For every 100 females age 18 and over, there were 90.5 males.

The median income for a household in the city was $24,485, and for a family was $27,500. Males had a median income of $28,125 versus $20,417 for females. The per capita income for the city was $15,004. About 16.1% of families and 18.1% of the population were below the poverty line, including 24.6% of those under age 18 and 4.2% of those age 65 or over.

Education
The City of Newcastle is served by the Newcastle Independent School District.

Officials
Newcastle Volunteer Fire Department has Gary Bohannan as chief and Kris Brice as emergency management coordinator.

Gina Maxwell is the mayor, and Jerry Stewart, Robbie Larance, Melba Quaid, Kris Brice, and Mike Peterson are city council members.

References

External links
 

Cities in Texas
Cities in Young County, Texas